Halfdan ("half Dane") is an Old Norse masculine given name. In Beowulf it is spelled Healfdene, and in Latin sources Haldan. It may refer to:

Mythical figures:
Halfdan, legendary king of the Scyldings in Beowulf, who also appears in Norse mythology
Halfdan the Old, ancient legendary king
Halfdan Hvitbeinn, mythical petty king in Norway
Halfdan the Valiant (7th century), legendary father of Ivar Vidfamne
Hálfdan Brönufostri, subject of the legendary saga Hálfdanar saga Brönufóstra
Halfdan Eysteinsson, subject of the legendary saga Hálfdanar saga Eysteinssonar

People:
Halfdan (floruit 782–807), Danish client of the Franks
Halfdan the Black (c. 820-c. 860), father of Harald I of Norway
Halfdan Ragnarsson (died 877), Viking, leader of the Great Heathen Army
Halfdan Haraldsson the Black, Norwegian petty king and grandson of Halfdan the Black
Halfdan, a joint King of Northumbria (reigned 902-910) - see Eowils and Halfdan
Halfdan the Mild, son of King Eystein Halfdansson, of the House of Yngling
Halfdan Bryn (1864–1933), Norwegian physician and physical anthropologist
Halfdan Christensen (1873–1950), Norwegian stage actor and theatre director
Halfdan Olaus Christophersen (1902–1980), Norwegian historian of ideas, non-fiction writer and World War II resistance member
Halfdan E (born 1965), Danish film and television composer
Halfdan Egedius (1877–1899), Norwegian painter and illustrator
Halfdan Wexel Freihow (born 1959), Norwegian literary critic, novelist, editor and book publisher
Halfdan Hegtun (1918–2012), Norwegian radio personality, comedian and writer, and politician
Halfdan Holth (1880–1950), Norwegian veterinarian and professor
Halfdan Jønsson (1891–1945), Norwegian trade unionist and World War II resistance member
Halfdan Kjerulf (1815–1868), Norwegian composer
Halfdan Lehmann (1825-1908), Norwegian government official
Halfdan T. Mahler (1923-2016), Danish medical doctor and three-term director-general of the World Health Organization
Halfdan Nielsen, Norwegian speedskater who set the world record in the 10,000 m in 1893
Halfdan Rasmussen (1915-2002), Danish poet
Halfdan Strøm (1863–1949), Norwegian painter
Halfdan Sundt (1873–1951), Norwegian physician and politician

Old Norse personal names